Tazeh Kand-e Sheshmal (also Romanized as Tāzh Kand-e Sheshmāl; also known as Tāzeh Kand and Tāzeh Kand-e Past) is a village in Beradust Rural District, Sumay-ye Beradust District, Urmia County, West Azerbaijan Province, Iran. At the 2006 census, its population was 50, in 10 families.

References 

Populated places in Urmia County